"I Will Love You Monday (365)" is a song by Danish singer-songwriter Aura Dione from her debut album Columbine. It was released as her debut single in Europe on 10 November 2009 by Island Records, except Denmark, where the original version, "I Will Love You Monday", was released as her third single in August 2008. The international version has another chorus and more instruments added compared to the original Danish version. Both versions are included on the German release.

In Germany "I Will Love You Monday (365)" reached No. 1 in its fourth week on the chart. It became No. 2 in Switzerland and Austria and charted within on the European Hot 100. The Danish version reached No. 20 in Denmark.

Music video
The music video shows Dione walking through different areas of Copenhagen followed by her shoes which dance and sing with her.

Track listings

Credits and personnel
Aura Dione – songwriter
Viktoria Sandström – songwriter, backing vocals
Patrik Berggren – songwriter, drums and drum programming, strings
David Åström – songwriter, drums and drum programming, strings
Kenneth Bager – arrangement
Per Ebdrup – arrangement, bass, programming
Kocky & Trash – co-producer
Gustaf Ljunggren – guitar, pedal steel guitar
Jonas Krag – mouth organ
Stefan Olsson – bass, programming, acoustic guitar, chorus guitar
Tomas Barfod – drums and drum programming
Jan Eliasson – mastering

Credits adapted from CD single liner notes.

Charts and certifications

Charts
"I Will Love You Monday"

"I Will Love You Monday (365)"

Year-end charts

Certifications

References

External links 
 
 

2009 singles
Aura Dione songs
Number-one singles in Germany
Songs written by Aura Dione
2009 songs
Island Records singles
Pop-folk songs